The Gloucester Lyceum (1830-1872) of Gloucester, Massachusetts, was an association for "the improvement of its members in useful knowledge, and the advancement of popular education." It incorporated in 1831.

From the 1830s through at least the 1860s, the Lyceum arranged lectures from notables such as: Ralph Waldo Emerson, Oliver Wendell Holmes, Sr., "the two Everetts, Choate, Sumner, Rantoul, Winthrop, Colfax, Greely, ... Parker, Curtis, Phillips, Bayard Taylor, Dr. Holland, Chapin, Starr King, Hillard, ... Beecher, Giles, Gough, Dr. Hayes, the Arctic explorer, Burlingame, ... Alger, Whipple, Murdoch, Vanderhoff, Bancroft, and Dana." From 1830, "meetings were held in Union Hall ... until 1844 when the Murray Institute was used for one season prior to the occupancy of the Town Hall."

In 1854 "the Lyceum opened its library on Wednesday and Saturday afternoons and evenings, with 1,400 volumes. It was located in the eastern parlor of the residence of F.G. Low on what was then the corner of Spring and Duncan Streets." Patrons could use the library for $1 per year; the fee was waived for those unable to afford it. In 1863 the library moved to Front Street; the building burned down in 1864. Thereafter it occupied rooms on Middle Street (in the Baptist church), and later on Front Street (in the Babson block). Much of the funding for the library came from "Samuel E. Sawyer, a Boston merchant, but a native of Gloucester."

The Lyceum became the Gloucester Lyceum and Sawyer Free Library under a new charter in 1872.

Lectures/Performances

 1830
 Hosea Hildreth
 William Ferson
 Mr. Spencer
 Benjamin Crowninshield
 Charles G. Putnam
 Henry Prentiss
 1832
 John James Babson
 1834
 Mr. Ward

 1835
 George S. Hillard
 A.H. Everett
 Jerome V.C. Smith
 Ezekiel W. Leach
 Rev. Mr. Sewall
 Daniel P. King
 Rev. Mr. Withington
 Rev. Mr. Fox
 Samuel E. Cowes
 A.L. Peirson
 Rev. Mr. Williams
 Rev. Mr. Worcester
 John S. Williams
 Rev. Mr. Thompson
 George H. Devereux
 R.S. Edes

 1848
 Henry David Thoreau
 1858-1859
 Henry Ward Beecher
 Daniel C. Eddy
 A.D. Mayo
 Wendell Phillips
 George Vandenhoff
 George B. Loring
 John G. Saxe
 George D. Prentice

 1860
 Mendelssohn Quintette Club
 Grace Greenwood
 George Sumner
 William W. Sylvester
 William H. Millburn, "the blind preacher"
 George William Curtiss, "author of Trumps"
 Rufus Laighton Jr.
 Benjamin H. Smith Jr.
 William Hague

See also
 Lyceum movement

References

Further reading
 

1830 establishments in Massachusetts
Education in Essex County, Massachusetts
Gloucester, Massachusetts
Libraries in Essex County, Massachusetts
Lyceum movement